Temenuzhka Petkova (born 18 January 1967) is a Bulgarian politician and accountant. Since November 7, 2014 she is the Minister of Energy in the Second Borisov Cabinet.  Petkova graduated from the University of National and World Economy.

References 

1967 births
Living people
Bulgarian conservatives
Government ministers of Bulgaria
Women government ministers of Bulgaria
21st-century Bulgarian politicians
21st-century Bulgarian women politicians
University of National and World Economy alumni